Daniel Andrew Johnson (born December 20, 1986), professionally known as Kane Beatz, is an American record producer and songwriter from Orlando, Florida.

Life and career

Johnson first found monetary success from producing while still in high school by selling his beats on the internet.  Working with artists such as Micah T from Invasion Productions.  He was soon contacted by Mike Caren, Executive Vice President of A&R for Atlantic Records, who signed him to a publishing contract with the label.

Since his success, Kane founded his own label called The Building. The first artist signed was The Mad Violinist. Since then he signed-songwriter Kief Brown and producer Jeremy "JMIKE" Coleman, who signed in a joint venture with Dr. Luke's Prescription Songs).

Artistry

Musical style
Johnson tags most of his beats with a robotic male voice saying, "Kane is in the building, *****."

Influences
He has stated that his favorite producers and largest musical influences are Timbaland, Dr. Dre, and Mannie Fresh.

Production discography

Singles produced

References

External links
 Kane Beatz discography at Discogs
 Kane Beatz at AllMusic
 Kane Beatz on Twitter

1986 births
Living people
African-American record producers
American hip hop record producers
Musicians from Miami
Musicians from Orlando, Florida
Southern hip hop musicians
21st-century African-American people
20th-century African-American people
FL Studio users